Artem Kontsevoy may refer to:

 Artem Kontsevoy (footballer, born 1983), Belarusian player for teams including Spartak Moscow, MTZ-RIPO Minsk and BATE Borisov and the national team
 Artem Kontsevoy (footballer, born 1999), Belarusian player currently playing for Rukh Brest and the national team